Hartshill is a large village and civil parish in North Warwickshire, England, 2.5 miles (4 km) north-west of the town of Nuneaton. The parish borders the district of Nuneaton and Bedworth at the south, the North Warwickshire district parishes of Ansley at the south-west, Mancetter at the north-west, and Caldecote at the east, and the parish of Witherley in Leicestershire to the north-east from which it is separated by the A5 road.

At the 2001 Census, the civil parish of Hartshill had a population of 3,611, decreasing to 3,596 at the 2011 Census. The English poet Michael Drayton, who knew William Shakespeare, was born at Chapel Cottage in Hartshill Green in 1563. Michael Drayton Junior School in Hartshill bears his name. Other schools in the village include Hartshill Academy secondary school. The parish has five pubs: The Stag & Pheasant, The Malt Shovel, Royal Oak, the Hartshill Club, and The Anchor which is on the Coventry Canal. The Talyllyn Railway locomotive Midlander was purchased in 1957 from Jee's quarries at Hartshill.

References

Bibliography

External links 

Photos of Hartshill and surrounding area on geograph

Villages in Warwickshire
Civil parishes in Warwickshire
Borough of North Warwickshire